Laura Bailey (born 6 August 1972) is an English model and photographer. She was born in Oxford, and her most notable campaigns include Guess jeans, L'Oreal, Jaguar, Jaeger, Marks and Spencer, Bella Freud, Ray-Ban, Oetker Collection hotel, Bodas, Temperley London and Solange Azagury-Partridge.Bailey is the brand ambassador for the house of CHANEL.

Bailey also works as a writer and has written on travel and style for Vogue, Harper's Bazaar, Vanity Fair, The Independent, the FT, The Daily Telegraph and The Sunday Times. She is a Cultural Ambassador for the British Fashion Council  and an Ambassador for Save The Children.

She is also the Contributing Editor at British Vogue.

As a photographer her work has been published in Vogue, Violet Book, FT How To Spend It and more, alongside personal portrait and documentary projects.

Bailey has also produced and starred in a number of short films for fashion labels including Bella Freud, Solange Azagury-Partridge, Trager Delaney, and Shrimps. Plus short films in sport and music.

In 2020 Bailey, in partnership with stylist Cathy Kasterine, collaborated with British menswear brand, Budd (shirtmakers) to create a collection of shirts and nightwear for women under the Bailey x Budd label.

She lives in London and has two children with her partner Eric Fellner: a son Luc and a daughter Lola Tiger.

Bailey is represented by TESS MANAGEMENT.

References

External links

1972 births
Alumni of the University of Southampton
English female models
Living people
Models from London